Yutu-2 is the robotic lunar rover component of CNSA's Chang'e 4 mission to the Moon, launched on 7 December 2018 18:23 UTC, it entered lunar orbit on 12 December 2018 before making the first soft landing on the far side of the Moon on 3 January 2019. Yutu-2 is currently operational as the longest-lived lunar rover and the first lunar rover traversing the far side of the Moon.

By January 2022, Yutu-2 had travelled a distance of more than  along the Moon's surface.

Overview

Both the stationary lander and Yutu-2 rover are equipped with a radioisotope heater unit (RHU) in order to heat their subsystems during the long lunar nights, while electrical power is generated by solar panels.

After landing, the lander extended a ramp to deploy the Yutu-2 rover (literally: "Jade Rabbit") to the lunar surface. Yutu-2 rover was manufactured in Dongguan, Guangdong province; it is solar-powered, RHU-heated, and it is propelled by six wheels. The rover's nominal operating time is three months, but after the experience with Yutu rover in 2013, the rover design was improved and Chinese engineers are hopeful it will operate for "a few years."

The landing craft touched down at 02:26 UTC on 3 January 2019, becoming the first spacecraft to land on the far side of the Moon. Yutu-2 rover was deployed about 12 hours after the landing.

Science payloads

 Panoramic Camera (PCAM), is installed on the rover's mast and can rotate 360°. It has a spectral range of 420 nm–700 nm and it acquires 3D images by binocular stereovision.
 Lunar penetrating radar (LPR), is a ground penetrating radar with a probing depth of approximately 30 m with 30 cm vertical resolution, and more than 100 m with 10 m vertical resolution.
 Visible and Near-Infrared Imaging Spectrometer (VNIS), for imaging spectroscopy that can then be used for identification of surface materials and atmospheric trace gases. The spectral range covers visible to near-infrared wavelengths (450 nm – 950 nm).
 Advanced Small Analyzer for Neutrals (ASAN), is an energetic neutral atom analyzer provided by the Swedish Institute of Space Physics (IRF). It will reveal how solar wind interacts with the lunar surface, which may help determine the process behind the formation of lunar water.

Cost
According to Wu Yanhua, the deputy director of the project, the cost of the entire mission was "close to building one kilometer of subway". The cost-per-kilometer of subway in China varies from 500 million yuan (about 72.6 million U.S. dollars) to 1.2 billion yuan (about 172.4 million U.S. dollars), depending on the difficulty of construction.

Landing site
The landing site is within a crater called Von Kármán ( diameter) in the South Pole-Aitken Basin on the far side of the Moon that was still unexplored by landers. The site has symbolic as well as scientific value: Theodore von Kármán was the PhD advisor of Qian Xuesen, the founder of the Chinese space program.

Operations and results
A few days after landing, Yutu-2 went into hibernation for its first lunar night and it resumed activities on 29 January 2019, with all instruments operating nominally. During its first full lunar day, the rover travelled , and on 11 February 2019 it powered down for its second lunar night. In May 2019, it was reported that Chang'e 4 has identified what appear to be mantle rocks on the surface, its primary objective.

In February 2020, Chinese astronomers reported, for the first time, a high-resolution image of a lunar ejecta sequence, and, as well, direct analysis of its internal architecture. These were based on observations made by the Lunar Penetrating Radar (LPR) on board the Yutu-2 rover while studying the far side of the Moon.

In December 2021, the rover pictured what appeared to be a particularly prominent boulder, dubbed the "Mystery Hut" (神秘小屋), or "Moon Cube", which it was intended to explore in the lunar days (earth months) ahead. On 7 January 2022, news reported that the rover reached the destination area after traveling for a month, and found that the "Mystery Hut" was an "irregularly shaped rock"; to some, the rock looks a bit like a rabbit, along with a nearby much smaller rock that looks like a carrot, which may be even more fitting overall since the rover's name Yutu means "Jade Rabbit".

See also
 Chinese Lunar Exploration Program
 Chang'e 4
 List of artificial objects on the Moon
Lunar rover
Rover (space exploration)

References 

2018 in China
Attached spacecraft
Chinese Lunar Exploration Program
Chinese space probes
Lunar rovers
Space probes launched in 2018
2019 on the Moon